Fumiya Osawa (born 11 September 1991) is a Japanese kickboxer, currently fighting in the lightweight division of K-1 and Krush, where he is the incumbent Krush Lightweight champion. Osawa is the 2018 K-1 Lightweight Grand Prix finalist.

Kickboxing career

Super Featherweight career

2012 Krush Contender Tournament
On April 22, 2012, Osawa fought in the quarterfinals of the Krush Super Featherweight tournament, being scheduled to fight Yuya Yamato. He won the fight by unanimous decision, and further beat Makoto Morishige by a first-round TKO in the semifinals. These two wins set up the fight with Katsuya Goto, the other tournament finalist, Krush 19.

After winning an extra round split decision against Katsuya Goto in the tournament finals, Shimano earned the chance to fight Hirotaka Urabe for the Krush Super Featherweight title, at Krush 20. Urabe won the fight by a first-round knockout, dropping Shimano with a spinning back kick.

Later Super Featherweight career
After his failed title bid, Osawa was scheduled to fight Yuji Takeuchi at Krush 23. He lost the fight by a third-round knockout.

Osawa was then scheduled to fight Koya Urabe at Krush 27. The fight would end in a disqualification win for Osawa, as Urabe landed an illegal punch as the referee was separating the two from a clinch entanglement. The two were immediately scheduled to fight a rematch at Krush 29. Urabe won the rematch by unanimous decision.

Osawa bounced back from these two losses with back-to-back victories over Keisuke Nakamura at Krush 33 by unanimous decision and Kotaro Shimano at Krush 36 by majority decision. This was followed by back-to-back losses by unanimous decision to Tomohiro Kitai at Krush 39 and Toshi at Krush 41.

Following an unbeaten streak of four fights, Osawa was scheduled to make his K-1 debut on July 4, 2015, in a rematch with Kotaro Shimano. As the fight ended in a draw, the two were scheduled to fight a rematch at K-1 World GP 2015: The Championship. Osawa won the fight by unanimous decision. Following a 3–2 run, which ended in a decision loss to Masanobu Goshu, Osawa moved up in weight to lightweight.

Lightweight career

Title fights
He was scheduled to make his lightweight debut against Junpei Aotsu at Krush 83. He would win this, as well as his next two fights against Kyoshiro and Bazooka Koki by unanimous decision. This three fight winning streak earned Osawa the chance to fight Gonnapar Weerasakreck for the Krush Lightweight title. Gonnapar won the fight by unanimous decision.

After losing to Gonnapar, Osawa participated in the 2018 K-1 Lightweight Grand Prix. He won a majority decision against Wei Liu in the quarterfinals, and beat Kyoshiro by a second-round TKO in the semifinals. Osawa fought Kenta Hayashi in the finals, and lost the fight by a third-round TKO.

Continued lightweight career
At K-1: K'Festa 2, Osawa was scheduled to fight Yuto Shinohara. Shinohara won the fight by unanimous decision.

Osawa rebounded with two consecutive victories over Yuzuki Satomi and Zhiwei Wang. He beat Satomi by unanimous decision, and was awarded a DQ win over Wang, after he Wang landed an illegal knee.

He was scheduled to fight a rematch with Yuto Shinohara in December 2019, but had to withdraw after suffering an injury in training.

At Krush 114, Osawa was scheduled to fight Hikaru Hasumi. Hasumi won the fight by TKO, after knocking Osawa down three times in the second round. He was then scheduled to fight Shuji Kawarada at K-1:Winter's Crucial Bout, and lost by split decision.

Osawa snapped the two-fight losing streak with an extra round unanimous decision against Shinichiro Kawasaki at Krush 123.

Osawa was scheduled to fight Koya Urabe at K-1 World GP 2021 in Fukuoka. He lost the bout by unanimous decision, with scores of 30-29, 30-29 and 30-28.

Osawa was scheduled to face Hiroki at K-1 World GP 2021 Japan on December 4, 2021. He won the fight by unanimous decision.

Krush lightweight champion
Osawa challenged the reigning Krush Lightweight champion Shuji Kawarada at Krush 136 on April 30, 2022, in what was Kawarada's first title defense. He won the fight by unanimous decision, with scores of 30–28, 30–28 and 30–27.

Osawa faced the 2020 True4U bantamweight tournament winner Dansiam Ayothayafightgym at K-1 World GP 2022 in Fukuoka on August 11, 2022. He won the fight by unanimous decision, with scores of 30–27, 30–28 and 29–28.

Osawa made his first Krush Lightweight title defense against Yuzuki Satomi at Krush 145 on January 21, 2023. He retained his title by unanimous decision, with two scorecards of 30–28 and one scorecard of 29–28. The result was changed into a no contest on January 29, 2023, as Osawa scored the sole knockdown of the fight off of an illegal kick catch.

Championships and accomplishments
RISE
 2009 RISE Lightweight Rookies Cup Winner
Krush
 2022 Krush Lightweight ChampionshipK-1 2018 K-1 Lightweight Grand Prix Runner-up

Fight record

|-  style="background:#c5d2ea;"
| 2023-01-21 || NC ||align=left| Yuzuki Satomi || Krush 145 || Tokyo, Japan || No Contest || 3 ||3:00 
|-
! style=background:white colspan=9 |
|-
|-  style="background:#cfc"
| 2022-08-11|| Win ||align=left| Dansiam Ayothayafightgym ||  K-1 World GP 2022 in Fukuoka || Fukuoka, Japan || Decision (Unanimous)|| 3 ||3:00
|-
|-  style="background:#cfc;"
| 2022-04-30 || Win ||align=left| Shuji Kawarada|| Krush 136 || Tokyo, Japan || Decision (Unainmous) || 3 || 3:00 
|-
! style=background:white colspan=9 |

|-  style="text-align:center; background:#cfc"
| 2021-12-04 || Win || align=left| Hiroki || K-1 World GP 2021 Japan || Osaka, Japan || Ext.R Decision (Unanimous)  ||4  ||3:00 
|-  style="background:#fbb;"
| 2021-07-17|| Loss ||align=left| Koya Urabe|| K-1 World GP 2021 in Fukuoka || Fukuoka, Japan || Decision (Unanimous) || 3 || 3:00
|-  style="background:#cfc;"
| 2021-03-27|| Win || align=left| Shinichiro Kawasaki || Krush 123 || Bunkyo, Tokyo, Japan || Decision (Unanimous) || 4 || 3:00
|-  style="background:#fbb;"
| 2020-12-12|| Loss || align=left| Shuji Kawarada || K-1 World GP 2020 Winter's Crucial Bout || Sumida, Tokyo, Japan || Ext.R Decision (Split) || 4 || 3:00
|-  style="background:#fbb;"
| 2020-07-11|| Loss || align=left| Hikaru Hasumi || Krush 114 || Shinjuku, Tokyo, Japan || TKO (Three knockdowns) || 2 || 1:45
|-  style="background:#cfc;"
| 2019-09-16 || Win || align=left| Zhiwei Wang || Krush 105 || Shinjuku, Tokyo, Japan || DQ (Illegal knee) || 1 || 2:21
|-  style="background:#cfc;"
| 2019-06-30 || Win || align=left| Yuzuki Satomi || K-1 World GP 2019: Super Bantamweight World Tournament || Sumida, Tokyo, Japan || Decision (Unanimous) || 3 || 3:00
|-  style="background:#fbb;"
| 2019-03-09 || Loss || align=left| Yuto Shinohara || K-1 World GP 2019: K’FESTA 2 || Saitama, Japan || Decision (Unanimous) || 3 || 3:00
|-  style="background:#fbb;"
| 2018-12-08 || Loss || align=left| Kenta Hayashi || K-1 World GP 2018: K-1 Lightweight World's Strongest Tournament, Final || Namba, Japan || TKO (Four knockdowns) || 3 || 1:52
|-  style="background:#cfc;"
| 2018-12-08 || Win|| align=left| Kyoshiro || K-1 World GP 2018: K-1 Lightweight World's Strongest Tournament, Semifinals || Namba, Japan || TKO (Punches) || 2 || 2:00
|-  style="background:#cfc;"
| 2018-12-08 || Win|| align=left| Wei Liu || K-1 World GP 2018: K-1 Lightweight World's Strongest Tournament Quarterfinals || Namba, Japan || Decision (Majority) || 3 || 3:00
|-  style="background:#fbb;"
| 2018-09-30 || Loss || align=left| Gonnapar Weerasakreck || Krush 93 || Tokyo, Japan || Decision (Unanimous) || 3 || 3:00
|-
! style=background:white colspan=9 |
|-  style="background:#cfc;"
| 2018-05-17 || Win || align=left| Bazooka Koki || Krush 88 || Tokyo, Japan || Decision (Unanimous) || 3 || 3:00
|-  style="background:#cfc;"
| 2018-03-10 || Win || align=left| Kyoshiro || Krush 85 || Tokyo, Japan || Decision (Unanimous) || 3 || 3:00
|-  style="background:#cfc;"
| 2017-12-09 || Win || align=left| Junpei Aotsu || Krush 83 || Tokyo, Japan || Decision (Unanimous) || 3 || 3:00
|-  style="background:#fbb;"
| 2017-08-06 || Loss || align=left| Masanobu Goshu || Krush 78 || Tokyo, Japan || Decision (Unanimous) || 3 || 3:00
|-  style="background:#cfc;"
| 2017-05-28 || Win || align=left| Takumi Yokoyama || Krush 76 || Tokyo, Japan || Decision (Unanimous) || 3 || 3:00
|-  style="background:#cfc;"
| 2017-03-03 || Win || align=left| Tatsuya Inaishi || Krush 74 || Tokyo, Japan || Decision (Unanimous) || 3 || 3:00
|-  style="background:#fbb;"
| 2016-10-15 || Loss || align=left| Taio Asahisa || Krush 70 || Tokyo, Japan || Decision (Majority) || 3 || 3:00
|-  style="background:#cfc;"
| 2016-07-18 || Win || align=left| Yoshiki Harada || Krush 67 || Tokyo, Japan || Decision (Unanimous) || 3 || 3:00
|-  style="background:#cfc;"
| 2015-11-21 || Win || align=left| Kotaro Shimano || K-1 World GP 2015 The Championship || Tokyo, Japan || Decision (Unanimous) || 3 || 3:00
|-  style="background:#c5d2ea;"
| 2015-07-04 || Draw || align=left| Kotaro Shimano || K-1 World GP 2015 -70kg Championship Tournament || Tokyo, Japan || Decision (Unanimous) || 3 || 3:00
|-  style="background:#cfc;"
| 2015-05-04 || Win || align=left| Syun Kentoshi || Krush 54 || Tokyo, Japan || Decision (Unanimous) || 3 || 3:00
|-  style="background:#cfc;"
| 2015-03-14 || Win || align=left| Hitoshi Aketo || Krush 52 || Tokyo, Japan || Decision (Majority) || 3 || 3:00
|-  style="background:#cfc;"
| 2014-10-05 || Win || align=left| Takeshi Watanabe || Krush 46 || Tokyo, Japan || Decision (Unanimous) || 3 || 3:00
|-  style="background:#c5d2ea;"
| 2014-08-09 || Draw || align=left| Leona Pettas || Krush 44 || Tokyo, Japan || Decision (Majority) || 3 || 3:00
|-  style="background:#fbb;"
| 2014-05-11|| Loss || align=left| Toshi || Krush 41|| Tokyo, Japan || Decision (Unanimous) || 3 || 3:00
|-  style="background:#fbb;"
| 2014-03-08 || Loss || align=left| Tomohiro Kitai || Krush 39 || Tokyo, Japan || Decision (Unanimous) || 3 || 3:00
|-  style="background:#cfc;"
| 2014-01-04 || Win || align=left| Kotaro Shimano || Krush 36 || Tokyo, Japan || Decision (Majority) || 3 || 3:00
|-  style="background:#cfc;"
| 2013-09-21 || Win || align=left| Keisuke Nakamura || Krush 33 || Tokyo, Japan || Decision (Unanimous) || 3 || 3:00
|-  style="background:#fbb;"
| 2013-06-16 || Loss || align=left| Koya Urabe || Krush 29 || Tokyo, Japan || Decision (Unanimous) || 3 || 3:00
|-  style="background:#cfc;"
| 2013-03-20 || Win || align=left| Koya Urabe || Krush 27 || Tokyo, Japan || DQ (Punching after the break) || 1 ||
|-  style="background:#fbb;"
| 2012-10-08 || Loss || align=left| Yuji Takeuchi || Krush 23 || Tokyo, Japan || KO (Left hook) || 3 || 1:35
|-  style="background:#fbb;"
| 2012-07-21 || Loss || align=left| Hirotaka Urabe || Krush 20 || Tokyo, Japan || KO (Spinning Back Kick to the Body) || 1 || 2:48
|-
! style=background:white colspan=9 |
|-  style="background:#cfc;"
| 2012-06-08 || Win || align=left| Katsuya Goto || Krush 19, Tournament Finals || Tokyo, Japan || Ext.R Decision (Split) || 4 || 3:00
|-
! style=background:white colspan=9 |
|-  style="background:#cfc;"
| 2012-04-22|| Win || align=left| Makoto Morishige || Krush-EX 2012 vol.2, Tournament Semiinals || Tokyo, Japan || TKO (Strikes) || 1 || 2:06
|-  style="background:#cfc;"
| 2012-04-22|| Win || align=left| Yuya Yamato || Krush-EX 2012 vol.2, Tournament Quarterfinals || Tokyo, Japan || Decision (Unanimous) || 3 || 3:00
|-  style="background:#fbb;"
| 2012-02-17 || Loss || align=left| Yuzo Suzuki || Krush 16 || Tokyo, Japan || Decision (Unanimous) || 3 || 3:00
|-  style="background:#c5d2ea;"
| 2011-12-09 || Draw || align=left| Katsuya Goto || Krush 14 || Tokyo, Japan || Decision (Majority) || 3 || 3:00
|-  style="background:#fbb;"
| 2011-10-10 || Loss || align=left| Sho Ogawa || Krush YOUTH GP 2011 Opening Round 1 || Tokyo, Japan || Decision (Unanimous) || 3 || 3:00
|-  style="background:#fbb;"
| 2011-08-21 || Loss || align=left| Kizaemon Saiga || Bigbang: The Road To Unification 6 || Tokyo, Japan || Decision (Majority) || 3 || 3:00
|-  style="background:#cfc;"
| 2011-05-29 || Win || align=left| Hiroki Namai || Krush -70kg Championship foundational Tournament Opening || Tokyo, Japan || KO (Right hook) || 3 || 1:21
|-  style="background:#fbb;"
| 2011-02-13|| Loss || align=left| Keisuke Nakamura || Krush-EX 2011 vol.1 || Tokyo, Japan || Ext.R Decision (Unanimous) || 4 || 3:00
|-  style="background:#fbb;"
| 2010-08-22 || Loss || align=left| Shingen Endo || J-NETWORK FORCE for the TRUTH of J 4th || Tokyo, Japan || Decision (Unanimous) || 3 || 3:00
|-  style="background:#fbb;"
| 2010-07-19 || Loss || align=left| Takashi Kaga || REBELS-EX || Tokyo, Japan || Technical Decision (Unanimous) || 1 || 3:00
|-  style="background:#cfc;"
| 2010-05-03 || Win || align=left| Makoto Morishige || J-NETWORK FORCE for the TRUTH of J 2nd || Tokyo, Japan || Decision (Unanimous) || 3 || 3:00
|-  style="background:#fbb;"
| 2009-12-04 || Loss || align=left| Koya Urabe || Krush-EX || Tokyo, Japan || KO || 3 || 1:24
|-  style="background:#cfc;"
| 2009-10-04 || Win || align=left| Shinichi Ishii || RISE 59 || Tokyo, Japan || Decision (Unanimous) || 3 || 3:00
|-
! style=background:white colspan=9 |
|-  style="background:#cfc;"
| 2009-06-28 || Win || align=left| Yukinobu Nakatsuka || RISE 56 ～RISING ROOKIES CUP～ || Tokyo, Japan || Decision (Unanimous) || 3 || 3:00
|-  style="background:#fbb;"
| 2009-04-05 || Loss || align=left| Kentaro Kimura || J-NETWORK J-FIGHT in SHINJUKU vol.8 || Tokyo, Japan || Decision (Majority) || 3 || 3:00
|-  style="background:#cfc;"
| 2009-01-18 || Win || align=left| Ken Watanabe || J-NETWORK J-FIGHT in SHINJUKU vol.7 || Tokyo, Japan || Decision (Unanimous) || 3 || 3:00
|-
| colspan=9 | Legend''':

See also
 List of male kickboxers

References

Japanese kickboxers
1991 births
Living people
Lightweight kickboxers
Japanese male kickboxers
Sportspeople from Tokyo